The women's 100 metres hurdles event at the 1993 Summer Universiade was held at the UB Stadium in Buffalo, United States on 17 and 18 July 1993.

Medalists

Results

Heats

Final
Wind: -1.2 m/s

References

Athletics at the 1993 Summer Universiade
1993 in women's athletics
1993